Senator Burks may refer to:

Charlotte Burks (born 1942), Tennessee State Senate
Tommy Burks (1940–1998), Tennessee State Senate